was a Japanese swimmer. He competed in the men's 100 metre freestyle at the 1932 Summer Olympics and the water polo tournament at the 1936 Summer Olympics.

References

External links
 

1912 births
1990 deaths
Japanese male freestyle swimmers
Japanese male water polo players
Olympic swimmers of Japan
Olympic water polo players of Japan
Swimmers at the 1932 Summer Olympics
Water polo players at the 1936 Summer Olympics
Sportspeople from Tokyo
20th-century Japanese people